Paolo Isaresi della Mirandola, O.P. (died 1602) was a Roman Catholic prelate who served as Bishop of Squillace (1601–1602).

Biography
Paolo Isaresi della Mirandola was ordained a priest in the Order of Preachers. On 13 August 1601, he was appointed during the papacy of Pope Clement VIII as Bishop of Squillace. On 9 September 1601, he was consecrated bishop by Girolamo Bernerio, Bishop of Ascoli Piceno, with Aurelio Novarini, Archbishop of Dubrovnik, and Agostino Quinzio, Bishop of Korčula, serving as co-consecrators. 
He served as Bishop of Squillace until his death in 1602.

References

External links and additional sources
 (for Chronology of Bishops) 
 (for Chronology of Bishops) 

17th-century Italian Roman Catholic bishops
Bishops appointed by Pope Clement VIII
1602 deaths
Dominican bishops